Allium neriniflorum is a species of wild onion native to Mongolia, the Zabaykalsky Krai region of Siberia, and northern China (Inner Mongolia, Hebei, Heilongjiang, Jilin, Liaoning). It grows on coastal sand dunes, wet meadows, hillsides, etc., at elevations up to 2000 m.

Leaves are round in cross-section, hollow, about the same length as the scape. Umbels contain only a few flowers, usually red or red-violet but sometimes white.

References

neriniflorum
Onions
Flora of Chita Oblast
Flora of Mongolia
Flora of Inner Mongolia
Flora of Manchuria
Flora of North-Central China
Plants described in 1855